Stefan Kneer (born 19 December 1985) is a German handball player for Rhein-Neckar Löwen and the German national team.

References

1985 births
Living people
German male handball players
People from Bühl (Baden)
Sportspeople from Karlsruhe (region)